Neil Grayston (born 25 November 1975) is an English professional footballer who plays as a full back.

Career
Born in Keighley, Grayston made seven appearances in the Football League for Bradford City during the 1995–96 season. He later played non-league football for a number of clubs, including Bradford Park Avenue, Southport, Halifax Town, Alfreton Town, Droylsden, and Guiseley.

References

1975 births
Living people
English footballers
Bradford City A.F.C. players
Bradford (Park Avenue) A.F.C. players
Southport F.C. players
Halifax Town A.F.C. players
Alfreton Town F.C. players
Droylsden F.C. players
Guiseley A.F.C. players
English Football League players
Association football fullbacks